Lawn bowls has been contested at Summer Paralympics on six occasions, first appearing on the schedule in 1968 and having its most recent outing at the 1996 games. The competitions were initially divided by sex, with singles and doubles events for men and women. In 1976, divisions by disability category were introduced, greatly expanding the number of events and medals. Participation peaked at the 1976 edition, with 80 entrants from 13 countries competing in 16 events. Great Britain was the most successful nation in this sport at each of the games it was held.

Summary

Medal table

References

 
Paralympics
Lawn bowls